Jota Sport is a British sports car racing team. Founded as Team Jota by Sam Hignett and John Stack, Jota Sport is part of the Jota Group which is owned by Sam Hignett and David Clark. The team is based in Tunbridge Wells in England. Jota Sport has finished on the overall podium of 2017 24 Hours of Le Mans with two Oreca in an alliance with Jackie Chan DC Racing.
In 2018/2019 Jota competed, in partnership with Arden International, RP Motorsport, Jackie Chan DC Racing and Aston Martin in the FIA World Endurance Championship with two ORECA 07 LMP2 and in the GT World Challenge Europe with Mclaren 720S GT3 cars.

History
Started in 2000 by, then university student in materials engineering, Sam Hignett and racing driver John Stack, Team Jota's first car was a Honda Integra built specifically for endurance racing. That year the team competed at 24 Hours Nürburgring and Spa 24 Hours.
The following year, the team raced in the Renault Clio V6 Trophy as well as taking the Honda Integra to 24 Hours Nürburgring for a second year. In 2002, they bought an SR2 class Pilbeam to compete in the FIA Sportscar Championship, finishing second overall in the SR2 championship; their second year with the Pilbeam saw them finish third.

2004 

In 2004, Team Jota purchased Zytek’s very first car (Zytek 04S), starting a relationship with the engineering company that still exists today.  Gianni Collini joined Hignett and Stack to drive the Zytek in the Le Mans Endurance Series where they finished 6th overall in the championship.

2005 

Team Jota competed in the Le Mans Endurance Series again in 2005 with the Zytek 04S, achieving another sixth overall result in the championship. This was the first year they also competed at Le Mans 24 Hours where they didn't finish due to an accident on track, but held fifth place up until hour 22. In addition to Hignett and Stack, Haruki Kurosawa, Gregor Fisken, Sam Hancock and Jason Tahincioglu drove for the team during the season.

2006 

During 2006, Team Jota ran the Zytek factory team in the newly named Le Mans Series, the Le Mans 24 Hours and the final two rounds of the American Le Mans Series which included Petit Le Mans and Mazda Raceway Laguna Seca. The final result for the Le Mans Series was fifth overall. The team finished 24th overall at Le Mans 24 Hours and fifth in their class.  Petit Le Mans saw a second place overall for the factory team with a seventh place overall at Mazda Raceway Laguna Seca, with the car driven by Stefan Johansson and Johnny Mowlem.

2007 

In 2007, the team ran a Lola-Judd LMP1 for Charouz Racing Systems which was Charouz's first venture into endurance racing.  The team finished fifth in the series with drivers Jan Charouz and Stefan Mucke, and fifth in class, eighth overall in the Le Mans 24 Hours with Alex Young joining the team. Team Jota again competed in the final two rounds of the American Le Mans Series for Zytek, finishing fourth overall and third in the LMP2 class at Petit Le Mans with drivers Danny Watts, Stefan Mucke and Jan Charouz.

2008

This year saw the introduction of the Jota Sport brand in partnership with Simon Dolan and Sam Hancock, with the team competing in the Porsche Carrera Cup GB.  Hancock drove for the team along with Phil Quaife and between them they achieved five pole positions and three race wins earning them a second-place finish in the championship.  Team Jota continued with sportscar racing and ran the Corsa Motorsports LMP1 Zytek in the American Le Mans Series as well as the ex-Charouz Lola-Judd at the Le Mans 24 Hours with CytoSport (Muscle Milk).  The car driven by Greg Pickett, Klaus Graf and Jan Lammers was a non finisher due to engine failure. Simon Dolan had his racing debut and first race win in April of this year at Snetterton in a Radical.

2009

The brand Team Jota was retired in 2009 and Jota Sport ran the newly developed Ligier JS49 prototype in the European V de V Sports Championship, Challenge Endurance Proto and the UK Speed Series. Hancock and Dolan drove the car this season achieving third overall in the UK Speed Series and 24th overall in the V de V Championship. The team also ran a Juno SSE in the V de V Championship which was driven by Ollie Hancock and Chris Cappuccini who finished 16th in the championship.  Johansson and Mowlem drove the Corsa Motorsports LMP1 Zytek in the American Le Mans Series again this year, their best result was a third place at Lime Rock.

2010

The team ran the Ligier JS49 for a second year in the European V de V Championship and the UK Speed Series, taking three first places over the season across both championships.  This year saw the team become an Official Partner Team to Aston Martin Racing competing with a GT4 Aston Martin in the Spa 24 Hours and Britcar Silverstone 24 Hours where they took a first in class and second in class respectively. Mazda UK also commissioned Jota to run their MX-5 sports cars to celebrate the car's 21st anniversary.  The cars were driven by six journalists at endurance races at Snetterton and Silverstone.

2011

With Aston Martin, the team competed in the Le Mans Series with a V8 Vantage GT2 car in the GTE Pro class.  Dolan and Hancock were joined by Chris Buncombe for the 6 hours of Silverstone and again when the team took part in the 2011 Le Mans 24 Hours.  The team's highest placing during the Le Mans Series Championship was fifth in class at Spa-Francorchamps and Estoril, with a DNF at Le Mans 24 Hours. Jota Sport was commissioned by Mazda to create a GT4 version of the MX-5 to compete in the Britcar Dunlop Production GTN Championship. The result for the season was seventh overall with Mark Ticehurst and Owen Mildenhall driving.

2012

Jota returned to the European Le Mans Series with the LMP2 Zytek Z11SN Nissan and also competed at the Le Mans 24 Hours and the Spa-Francorchamps round of the FIA World Endurance Championship. The team achieved a class win at Spa but failed to finish the Le Mans 24 hours after retiring nearly 20 hours in. Jota ran the Mazda MX-5 GT4 in the British GT Championship in 2012, again with Ticehurst and Mildenhall driving with the best result of the season a third in class at Brands Hatch.

2013

The team continued in the European Le Mans Series with the LMP2 Zytek Z11SN Nissan with a class win at Silverstone and finishing third overall in the championship.  In the Le Mans 24 Hours they finished seventh in class with the Zytek, which was thirteenth overall.

2014

Jota Sport's third consecutive year running the LMP2 Zytek Z11SN Nissan saw a class win and fifth overall at the Le Mans 24 Hours, and a first, second and third in the European Le Mans Series which secured them second place in class in the championship.  They were also commissioned by Mazda Motor Corporation to design, build and run a V4 category MX-5 for the Nurburgring 24 hours.  Driven by Teruaki Kato, Stefan Johansson, Mildenhall and Wolfgang Kaufmann the car did not finish due to accident damage.

2015

For the 2015 season, the Zytek car had a change of name and model; the new car was a Nissan Nismo powered Gibson 015S LMP2 class, which again competed in the European Le Mans Series.  Jota Sport ended the year with a third place in the European Le Mans Series, achieving a first, second and two third places during the Championship, as well as a first in class, ninth overall at the FIA World Endurance Championship race at Spa-Francorchamps. The Le Mans 24 Hours saw the team finish second in class and tenth overall.

2016

At the beginning of the 2016 season, JOTA Sport announced a landmark sponsorship deal with Russian energy company, Gazprom. As part of the sponsorship, Gazprom obtained the naming rights for JOTA Sport, so they competed as G-Drive during the 2016 FIA WEC and European Le Mans Series.

In the 2016 European Le Mans Series, JOTA Sport raced a Gibson 015S, whilst in the 2016 FIA WEC, the team competed in an Oreca 05. The ELMS car was raced by Simon Dolan, Giedo van der Garde and Harry Tincknell. For Rounds 2 and 3 of the FIA WEC season, the 6 Hours of Spa-Francorchamps and 24 Hours of Le Mans respectively, Jake Dennis replaced Tincknell.
Roman Rusinov, Nathanael Berthon and Rene Rast were announced as the driver line up for the 2016 FIA WEC season. In June 2016, JOTA Sport announced that the team had parted company with Berthon. Will Stevens replaced Berthon for Round 3 of the 2016 FIA WEC Championship, the 24 Hours of Le Mans.

In June 2016, JOTA Sport announced that Alex Brundle, son of former Formula One driver Martin Brundle, had replaced Berthon as part of the WEC driver line-up, alongside Rusinov and Rast.

2017

In 2017, Jota Sport joined forces with Jackie Chan DC Racing to run two Oreca 07 LMP2 cars in the 2017 FIA World Endurance Championship.  Car 37 was driven by Jackie Chan DC Racing founder, David Cheng, ELMS LMP3 2016 champion, Alex Brundle and Frenchman Tristan Gommendy. Car 38 was driven by Ho-Pin Tung, Oliver Jarvis and Thomas Laurent.

2018/2019

2018 saw a second year partnering with Jackie Chan DC Racing for a larger than normal race calendar of the FIA World Endurance Championship.  Again running two Oreca 07 LMP2 cars with Gibson Technology 4.2 V8 engines.  Car 37 was driven by David Heinemeier Hansson, Will Stevens and Jordan King.  Car 38 was driven by Ho-Pin Tung, Stephane Richelmi and Gabriel Aubry.  The WEC calendar covered 13 months to move the championship to a winter schedule with car 38 finishing second in the championship and car 37 taking third.  Car 37 took 8th place overall at Le Mans 24 Hours 2018 but failed to finish in the 2019 event due to a gear box problem. Car 38 claimed 10th place in Le Mans in 2018 and 7th in 2019.

2019/2020

Jota again raced the two Oreca 07 LMP2 cars with Gibson Technology 4.2 V8 engines in a second winter schedule FIA World Endurance Championship covering 15 months but Covid disruption meant no racing between February and August 2020. Car 38 driven by Anthony Davidson, António Félix da Costa and Roberto Gonzalez finished second in class, 6th overall, at the 2020 24 Hours of Le Mans whilst car 37, partnered with Jackie Chan DC Racing, driven by Ho-Pin Tung, Will Stevens and Gabriel Aubry failed to finish. For the second year running, car 38 finished second in the WEC and car 37 finished third.

2021

The 2021 FIA World Endurance Championship returned to a summer schedule and Jota ran the two Oreca 07 LMP2 cars with Gibson Technology 4.2 V8 engines but with a change of number for the 37 car to number 28 and a new trio of drivers – Tom Blomqvist, Sean Gelael and Stoffel Vandoorne.  Car 38 was driven by António Félix da Costa, Roberto Gonzalez and Will Stevens.  Car 28 finished second in class and 8th overall at 2021 24 Hours of Le Mans while car 38 was 8th in class and 13th overall.  For the third year running, car 38 was second 2021 FIA World Endurance Championship and car 28 took third place.

This year also saw Jota partner with Era Motorsport in the 2021 Asian Le Mans Series, running an Oreca 07 LMP2 car, where they finished 2021 LMP2 Am class champions.

2022

A dominating season for car 38, driven by António Félix da Costa, Roberto Gonzalez and Will Stevens; first in class, 5th overall, at 2021 24 Hours of Le Mans and five podiums out of six during the 2022 FIA World Endurance Championship saw Jota win the championship for the first time, 21 points ahead of the competition. Car 28, driven by Oliver Rasmussen, Ed Jones and Jonathan Aberdein, finished third in class, 7th overall, at Le Mans and finished the WEC in 6th place.

2023
Jota Sport will become Porsche's customer racing team to campaign the Porsche 963 LMDh racing car in the Hypercar class of the FIA World Endurance Championship as a new name Hertz Team JOTA. Porsche later announced that the first customer 963s would not be delivered until April 2023 due to delays caused by supply chain disruptions, forcing team to miss the opening races of the WEC, something that the teams understood when engaging in talks with Porsche to take delivery. In November 2022, the team announced that Chinese Driver Ye Yifei will join team. Ye will become part of the Hertz Team Jota Hypercar programme alongside António Félix da Costa and Will Stevens. With the advent of their Hypercar program and continued presence in LMP2, Jota paused their factory GT3 program for 2023.

24 Hours of Le Mans results

References

External links

British auto racing teams
Auto racing teams established in 2000
2000 establishments in England
24 Hours of Le Mans teams
European Le Mans Series teams
Porsche Carrera Cup Great Britain teams
FIA Sportscar Championship entrants
FIA World Endurance Championship teams
WeatherTech SportsCar Championship teams